Gianluca Bollini (born 24 March 1980) is a Sammarinese footballer who played as a centre-back for the San Marino national team.

References

Living people
1980 births
Sammarinese footballers
Association football central defenders
San Marino international footballers
S.P. Tre Fiori players
S.S. Murata players